Monet Happy Mazur (born April 17, 1976) is an American actress.

Life
Mazur was born in Los Angeles, California, the daughter of Ruby Mazur, an illustrator known for creating the "tongue" logo for the Rolling Stones' "Tumbling Dice" single jacket, and a former model. Mazur is the oldest of four siblings and the only daughter – their given names were taken from the surnames of famous artists (Monet, a brother named for Matisse, and twin brothers named for Cézanne and Miro). Mazur is of Jewish ancestry on her father's side. Mazur's cousin is Epic Mazur of the band Crazy Town, in which she appeared in the music video to their song "Revolving Door" alongside Kimberly Stewart.

In April 2005, Mazur married British film director Alex de Rakoff. They have two sons, born in 2005 and 2011. In July 2018, the couple filed for divorce.

Career
Mazur began modeling and acting in her teens. One of her most well-known ad campaigns is the three TV commercials for Gap she did with director Adam Daelay in 1999: "Everybody in Cords", "Everybody in Leather" and "Everybody in Vests", in which she sings. She has appeared in a number of widely released films in the past several years, including Torque, Dead Man Running, Monster-in-Law, Stoned, and Just Married. She has also appeared in several television series, including Castle, CSI: Miami, Cold Case, Strange World, Chuck, and Rizzoli & Isles.

Early in the first (2009) season of the television series NCIS: Los Angeles, Mazur appeared in a single episode as a Secret Service agent who is enamored with Chris O'Donnell's lead character. While the role was potentially to be recurring, Mazur’s character did not reappear on the series. She appeared in three episodes, over 2009 and 2010, of Castle as Gina, the publisher and ex-wife of character Richard Castle.

Since 2018 she has played Laura Baker in The CW drama series, All American, which premiered in October 2018, and which was renewed for a fourth season in February 2021.

Filmography

Films

Television

Other credits 
 "Revolving Door" (2001 music video), by Crazy Town
 Transformers Universe (2014 video game), as Astraea (voice role)
 Snatch (2017 TV series), as Associate Producer (season 1)

References

External links

Monet Mazur - Yahoo! Movies
Monet Mazur
MovieHole, 1/23/04
Brant publications, 9/01

1976 births
20th-century American actresses
21st-century American actresses
Actresses from Los Angeles
American child actresses
Female models from California
American film actresses
American people of Jewish descent
American television actresses
Living people